Monomachos, or in Latin Monomachus, in Ukrainian and Russian Мономах (Monomakh), is a Greek epithet, meaning "he who fights alone" and "gladiator".

It applies specifically to: 

Monomachos (Byzantine family), a family of Byzantine officials
Niketas Monomachos, Byzantine official and saint
Constantine IX Monomachos, Byzantine emperor (r. 1042–1055)
Theodosios Monomachos, nephew of the above, Byzantine official and usurper
Michael Monomachos, 14th-century Byzantine general
Vladimir II Monomakh, Rus' Grand Prince (r. 1113–1125)
Hannibal Monomachus, a friend and staff officer of the Carthaginian general Hannibal

See also
Monomakh's Cap, a symbol-crown of the Russian autocracy
Monomachus Crown, a set of pieces of engraved Byzantine goldwork